Albanian National League (in Albanian: Lidhja Kombëtare Shqiptare) is a political party in Albania, founded in 1997. It is led by Ismet Mehmeti. The party has taken its name from a historic nationalist movement, Albanian National League founded by inhabitants from the arbëresh village of Santa Cristina Gela in Sicily, Italy.

References 

Political parties in Albania
1997 establishments in Albania
Political parties established in 1997